Stenichneumon is a genus of ichneumon wasps in the family Ichneumonidae. There are at least 20 described species in Stenichneumon.

Species
These 23 species belong to the genus Stenichneumon:

 Stenichneumon affinis (Kokujev, 1927) c g
 Stenichneumon alpicola (Kriechbaumer, 1872) c g
 Stenichneumon annulicornis (Szépligeti, 1901) c g
 Stenichneumon appropinquans (Cameron, 1897) c g
 Stenichneumon crenatus (Berthoumieu, 1894) c g
 Stenichneumon culpator (Schrank, 1802) c g b
 Stenichneumon ephippiatus (Dalla Torre, 1902) c g
 Stenichneumon exquisitus (Cresson, 1868) c g
 Stenichneumon exsculptus (Habermehl, 1920) c g
 Stenichneumon flavolineatus Uchida, 1926 c g
 Stenichneumon inexspectatus Heinrich, 1936 c g
 Stenichneumon laetabilis (Tosquinet, 1889) c g
 Stenichneumon maculiceps (Cameron, 1904) c g
 Stenichneumon maculitarsis (Cameron, 1903) c g
 Stenichneumon militarius (Thunberg, 1822) c g
 Stenichneumon nigriorbitalis Uchida, 1930 c g
 Stenichneumon odaiensis Uchida, 1932 c
 Stenichneumon pallidipennis (Viereck, 1902) c g
 Stenichneumon posticalis (Matsumura, 1912) c g
 Stenichneumon ringii (Holmgren, 1884) c g
 Stenichneumon salvus (Cresson, 1877) c g
 Stenichneumon seticornis (Tischbein, 1868) c g
 Stenichneumon ussuriensis Heinrich, 1980 c g

Data sources: i = ITIS, c = Catalogue of Life, g = GBIF, b = Bugguide.net

References

Further reading

External links

 

Ichneumoninae